Anacridium is a genus of "tree locusts" or "bird grasshoppers" belonging to the subfamily Cyrtacanthacridinae.

Species
The Orthoptera Species File lists:
Anacridium aegyptium (Linnaeus, 1764) - type species (as Gryllus aegyptium L.)
Anacridium burri Dirsh & Uvarov, 1953
Anacridium deschauenseei Rehn, 1941
Anacridium eximium (Sjöstedt, 1918)
Anacridium flavescens (Fabricius, 1793)
Anacridium illustrissimum (Karsch, 1896)
Anacridium incisum Rehn, 1942
Anacridium javanicum Willemse, 1932
Anacridium melanorhodon (Walker, 1870)
Anacridium moestum (Serville, 1838)
Anacridium rehni Dirsh, 1953
Anacridium rubrispinum Bey-Bienko, 1948
Anacridium wernerellum (Karny, 1907)

References

Acrididae genera
Taxa named by Boris Uvarov
Cyrtacanthacridinae